Quercus gulielmi-treleasei is a species of plant in the family Fagaceae. It is found in Costa Rica and Panama. It is placed in section Lobatae.

References

gulielmi-treleasi
Vulnerable plants
Taxonomy articles created by Polbot